Chrysothrix septemseptata is a species of crustose lichen in the family Arthoniaceae. Found in India, it was formally described as a new species in 2006 by T.A.M. Jagadeesh Ram, H. Thorsten Lumbsch, Robert Lücking, and G.P. Sinha. The type specimen was collected in the Sundarbans Biosphere Reserve (West Bengal); here it was found growing on the bark of the mangrove tree Tamarix gallica. It contains vulpinic acid as a major secondary chemical, and minor amounts of calycin. Chrysothrix septemseptata is only known to occur at the type locality. Other mangrove trees that it is found on include Brugruiera gymnorhiza, Heritiera fomes, and Sonneratia apetala, as well as the non-mangrove tree Casuarina equisetifolia. The specific epithet septemseptata refers to the seven septa that are characteristic of the ascospores of this lichen.

References

septemseptata
Lichen species
Lichens described in 2006
Lichens of India
Taxa named by Helge Thorsten Lumbsch
Taxa named by Robert Lücking